{{Taxobox
| image = Diazona-violacea.jpg
| image_caption = The ascidian Diazona violacea, Firth of Lorne, Scotland, 20 m
| regnum = Animalia
| phylum = Chordata
| classis = Ascidiacea
| ordo = Enterogona
| subordo = Phlebobranchia
| familia = Diazonidae
| genus = Diazona
| species = D. violacea
| binomial = Diazona violacea| binomial_authority = Savigny, 1816
| synonyms = 
| synonyms_ref = 
}}Diazona violacea is a species of tunicate, an ascidian in the family Diazonidae. It is the type species of the genus Diazona''.

Distribution
This species is known from the northeast Atlantic from the British Isles to Portugal, and in the Mediterranean Sea. In the British Isles it is found off Scotland, Ireland and SW England. It is a cold water species found below 30 m in Plymouth but as shallow as 15 m in Scotland.

Description
This colonial ascidian is translucent grey with transparent zooids. The zooids are marked with white internal lines and circles and there are typically six spots around the exhalant siphon.

References

External links
 

Enterogona
Fauna of the Atlantic Ocean
Fauna of the Mediterranean Sea
Animals described in 1816
Taxa named by Marie Jules César Savigny